Charlotte “Lotte” Clapp (born on the 13th of January, 1995) is an English-born rugby union player who plays internationally for the United States and for Saracens in the Premier 15s.

Rugby career 
Clapp joined Saracens in 2014 and made her debut against Lichfield.

Clapp previously played for England and has won ten caps for them. She featured for England against the Eagles at the 2016 Super Series in Utah. She has also captained Saracens to three titles.

Clapp took a break from rugby to train as a teacher and on her return, switched to representing the United States, which she qualifies for because of her American-born mother. She made her international debut for the Eagles at the 2022 Pacific Four Series. In August 2022, she re-signed with Saracens for the 2022–23 Premier 15s season.

Clapp was selected in the Eagles squad for the delayed 2021 Rugby World Cup in New Zealand.

References

External links 

 Eagles Profile
 Saracens Profile

Living people
1995 births
Female rugby union players
American female rugby union players
United States women's international rugby union players
English female rugby union players
England women's international rugby union players